Aeromechanics is the science about mechanics that deals with the motion of air and other gases, involving aerodynamics, thermophysics and aerostatics. It is the branch of mechanics that deals with the motion of gases (especially air) and their effects on bodies in the flow. The fluid flow and structure are interactive systems and their interaction is dynamic. The fluid force causes the structure to deform which changes its orientation to the flow and hence the resulting fluid force.

Areas that comprise this are within the technology of aircraft and helicopters since these use propellers and rotors.

See also 
 Aerodynamics

Aerodynamics